Wanlaweyn District is a district in the southeastern Lower Shabelle (Shabeellaha Hoose) region of Somalia. Its capital lies at Wanlaweyn.

References

External links
 Districts of Somalia
 Administrative map of Wanlaweyn District

Districts of Somalia

Lower Shabelle